is a 2013 video game based on the Sword Art Online light novel series. The game was released in both standard and limited edition box sets in Japan on March 14, 2013, for PlayStation Portable. A 2014 sequel, Sword Art Online: Hollow Fragment, includes all of the original game's content.

Gameplay
The gameplay has many similarities to MMORPGs, though it is not an online game, including the ability to buy and upgrade weapons, go on missions, and fight in a group with other characters. The protagonist, Kirito, can equip ten types of weapons, such as swords and axes.

Plot
The game follows an alternate storyline from the end of the first arc of the original story, in which a glitch causes Kirito and the other players to remain in Sword Art Online despite defeating Heathcliff, and players from other VRMMORPGs, such as second and third arc protagonists Leafa and Sinon, get sucked into the game themselves.

Development
The game was released on March 14, 2013, in Japan for the PlayStation Portable. In June 2014, Bandai Namco released a patch that added a new game mode, which added additional gameplay after completion of the main storyline.

Reception
The game sold 138,180 physical retail copies within the first week of release in Japan, topping the Japanese software sales charts for that week. By June 2013, it had shipped over 200,000 copies. Famitsu awarded it scores of 8, 7, 7 and 7 out of 10, totaling 29 out of 40.

Remake

The game was remade for the PlayStation Vita in the form of Sword Art Online: Hollow Fragment. Some features, like the player's points and skills, can be transferred from Infinity Moment to Hollow Fragment.

References

External links
  

2013 video games
PlayStation Portable games
PlayStation Network games
PlayStation Vita games
Science fantasy video games
Science fiction video games
Video games developed in Japan
Infinity Moment
Bandai Namco games